The city of Wrexham has two main city parks, these being Bellevue Park and Acton Park. On the outskirts of the city there is also open parkland on and surrounding the Erddig estate. There is also a city centre green.

A total of 13 parks and green spaces in Wrexham city have been, or are in the process of being, legally protected with green space charity Fields in Trust ensuring they can never be built on, nor lost to development. A further 24 parks and open spaces have also been awarded the protection in the wider Wrexham County Borough.

Parks
Bellevue Park (Parciau) – opened in 1910. It is located to the south-east of Wrexham city centre in Offa. It hosts a Queen Victoria statue originally from Gulidhall Square on Chester Street, and a bandstand pavilion opened in 1915. The park has hosted the National Eisteddfod of Wales twice in 1912 and 1933. The park was neglected during the 1970s, and many of the amenities were in a poor state of repair. A major project was undertaken to refurbish the Park back to its original splendour. This was funded by the Heritage Lottery Fund, Urban Parks Project, Welsh Development Agency, and the European Regional Development Fund. The park reopened in its restored original Edwardian condition in June 2000. It now boasts children's play areas, a bowling green constructed in 1914 which is home to the Parciau Bowling Club, tennis, and basketball courts and an original Edwardian bandstand set in an amphitheatre. In the summer months social events take place in the park, such as music concerts, and children's outdoor activity events.

The site the park now stands upon, was originally the landscaped grounds of Acton Hall, created in the 1790s. The grounds and hall were transferred to Wrexham Municipal Borough Council in 1947, with the hall demolished in 1954.

Acton Park features a bowling green, tennis courts, a children's play area, Japanese-style garden and a large lake which has attracted diverse wildlife. The general layout of the park has remained unchanged since it was laid out in the 18th century and now boasts many mature trees. The park also is home to Gorsedd stones, originally constructed for the National Eisteddfod in Bellevue Park, until they were moved to Acton Park.

City centre green 
Llwyn Isaf, – which is situated alongside Wrexham Guildhall, is a popular green area within the city centre. The green was originally the landscaped grounds of a mansion house of the same name. It now lies at the centre of Wrexham's civic centre just off Queens Square and near Wrexham Library, with it sometimes known as "Library Field". The Welsh Children in Need concert was held at this location in 2005. Council-sponsored events such as Christmas fairs and the Wrexham Food and Drink Festival (Wrexham Feast) are held on the site. The green hosts a bandstand.

Open parkland

Erddig Park – is situated two miles (3 km) south of the city centre, where the city meets the Clywedog Valley. The park is owned and managed by the National Trust, and is home to Erddig Hall and its formal gardens. The park is also home to a number of notable historic features. These include a hydraulic ram known as the "Cup and Saucer", which is used to pump water from the park to Erddig Hall, and the remains of Wristleham motte and bailey which is thought to be the beginnings of Wrexham as a city in the 12th century.

Nearby country parks

There are seven parks and country parks located on the outskirts of Wrexham, in the wider Wrexham County Borough, at Tŷ Mawr (Cefn Mawr), Alyn Waters (Gwersyllt), Minera Leadmines (Minera), Bonc-yr-Hafod (Hafod), Moss Valley (Moss), Nant Mill (River Clywedog trail) and Stryt Las (Johnstown). As well as two other country houses at Brynkinalt and Iscoyd Park.

References

Wrexham
Wrexham